The Youngster Coast Challenge, formerly known as the Handzame Challenge, is a one-day road cycling race held annually in West Flanders, Belgium. Since 2019, it has been a 1.2U rated event on the UCI Europe Tour, meaning it is reserved for U23 riders. It is the under-23 edition of the Bredene Koksijde Classic, and is held on the same day.

Winners

References

Cycle races in Belgium
UCI Europe Tour races
Recurring sporting events established in 2014
2014 establishments in Belgium